Spartaco Bandinelli (27 March 1921 – 17 February 1997) was an Italian boxer. He was born and died in Velletri.

He started boxing at the amateur level at the age of 16. World War II would interrupt his boxing carrier, he was drafted into the Italian army. At the end of the war he joined AS Audace, a Roman sports club. On the occasion of the national championships in Vigevano he was noticed by the coach of the Italian national boxing team, Steve Klaus.

He competed for Italy in the 1948 Summer Olympics held in London, United Kingdom in the flyweight event where he finished in second place, losing to Pascual Pérez of Argentina.

1948 Olympic results
Below are the results of Spartaco Bandinelli who competed for Italy as a flyweight boxer at the 1948 London Olympics:

 Round of 32: defeated Olli Lehtinen (Finland) on points
 Round of 16: defeated Leslie Handunge (Ceylon) on points
 Quarterfinal: defeated Luis Martinez (Spain) on points
 Semifinal: defeated Han Soo-An (South Korea) on points
 Final: lost to Pascual Perez (Argentina) on points (was awarded silver medal)

References
 Spartaco Bandinelli's profile at Sports Reference.com

1921 births
1997 deaths
People from Velletri
Flyweight boxers
Olympic boxers of Italy
Olympic silver medalists for Italy
Boxers at the 1948 Summer Olympics
Olympic medalists in boxing
Medalists at the 1948 Summer Olympics
Italian male boxers
Italian military personnel of World War II
Sportspeople from the Metropolitan City of Rome Capital
20th-century Italian people